The Machine That Changed the World is a 1990 book about automobile production, written by James P. Womack, Daniel T. Jones, and Daniel Roos. 
 
This book made the term lean production known worldwide. A revised edition was published in 2007.

See also
Lean manufacturing
Automotive engineering

Bibliography 
Roos, Daniel; Womack, James P.; Jones, Daniel T.: The Machine That Changed the World: The Story of Lean Production, Harper Perennial (November 1990), 

Automotive engineering
Lean manufacturing